Aziz Bhatti Town (Punjabi) is an administrative town (tehsil) in Lahore, Punjab, Pakistan. 

It forms one of the 10 municipalities of Lahore District. The town is named after the Pakistani war hero Raja Aziz Bhatti.

Neighbourhoods

See also
Lahore City District

References